The World at Her Feet is a lost 1927 silent film comedy directed by Luther Reed and starring Florence Vidor. It was produced by  the Paramount Lasky Corporation.

Cast
Florence Vidor as Jane Randall
Arnold Kent as Richard Randall
Margaret Quimby as Alma Pauls
Richard Tucker as Dr. H.G. Pauls
William Austin as Detective Hall
David Torrence as Client

References

External links
 The World at Her Feet at IMDb.com

herald, ..publicity poster,..lantern slide

1927 films
American silent feature films
Lost American films
American films based on plays
Films based on works by Louis Verneuil
American black-and-white films
Silent American comedy films
1927 comedy films
1927 lost films
Films directed by Luther Reed
1920s American films